Owlia may refer to:
 Owlia, Hamadan
 Owlia, Tehran